Small Axe may refer to:

 "Small Axe" (song), 1973 song by Bob Marley and the Wailers
 Small Axe (anthology), 2020 anthology of films by Steve McQueen
 Small Axe Project, academic journal about Caribbean literature